Ralph Rosenberg (born 7 October 1949) is an American politician.

Ralph Rosenberg is of Jewish descent, born to parents Nathan and Rhea Rosenberg in Chicago on 7 October 1949. He was educated at Bowen High School, and graduated from the University of Illinois in 1972, then completed legal studies at Drake Law School in 1974. He remained in Story County, serving as county attorney for juvenile court and director of the county branch of The Legal Aid Society. Rosenberg was first elected to the Iowa House of Representatives in 1981 and represented District 42. He won his first full term in 1982, and remained in office as the legislator from District 73 between 1983 and 1991. Rosenberg subsequently served on the Iowa Senate, elected from District 37. In the midst of his single term as state senator, Rosenberg was redistricted to District 31.

References

Jewish American attorneys
District attorneys in Iowa
Jewish American people in Iowa politics
Members of the Iowa House of Representatives
1949 births
Living people
20th-century American lawyers
20th-century American politicians
Iowa state senators
Politicians from Chicago
Politicians from Ames, Iowa
University of Illinois alumni
Drake University Law School alumni